Shiggaon Assembly constituency is one of the 224 Legislative Assembly constituencies of Karnataka state in India.

It is part of Haveri district, and a segment of Dharwad Lok Sabha seat.

Members of Assembly 
Source:

Election results

2018 Elections

1962 
 Fakkirappa Shiddappa Taware (INC) : 20,838 votes 
 Fakkiragouda Tirakanagouda Patil (PSP) : 6,606

See also
 List of constituencies of the Karnataka Legislative Assembly
 Haveri district

References

Haveri district
Assembly constituencies of Karnataka